The Acree-Rosenheim reaction is a chemical test used for detecting the presence of tryptophan in proteins. A protein mixture is mixed with formaldehyde. Concentrated sulfuric acid is added to form two layers. A purple ring appears between the two layers if the test is positive for tryptophan.

The test was named after two greats in biochemistry, namely, Solomon Farley Acree (1875–1957), a distinguished American Biochemist at Johns Hopkins University and Sigmund Otto Rosenheim (1871–1955), an Anglo-German Medical Chemist at the University of Manchester.

Reaction 
The reaction of tryptophan with formaldehyde.

References

Protein methods
Chemical tests